Ty - supermodel, Cycle 2 was the second Cycle of the Russian reality show on the STS TV channel, a competition of non-professional aspiring models. For the second time Fyodor Bondarchuk was the host. In this Cycle the contestants did not live in a hotel apartment but on a boat.

Eighteen-year-old Svetlana Sergienko from Sochi won the competition and a contract worth $250,000 with Elite Model Management in Copenhagen, a cover of Cosmopolitan magazine, a campaign for Mia cosmetic and will represent Russia in Elite Model Look in Shanghai.

Episode Guide

Episode 1
Original airdate: January 29, 2005

First call-out: Svetlana Sergienko	
Bottom two: Dariya Ivanova & Kristina Andreeva		   	
Eliminated: Kristina Andreeva

Episode 2
Original airdate: January 30, 2005

First call-out: Nataliya Malyutina	 	
Bottom two: Arina Morozova & Alyona Tsepova			   	
Eliminated: Alyona Tsepova

Episode 3
Original airdate: February 5, 2005

First call-out: Anastasiya Titova		
Bottom two: Ekaterina Borisova & Dariya Ivanova	
Eliminated: Ekaterina Borisova

Episode 4
Original airdate: February 6, 2005

First call-out: Svetlana Sergienko	
Bottom two: Dariya Ivanova & Svetlana Kostecko		   	
Eliminated: Dariya Ivanova

Episode 5
Original airdate: February 12, 2005

First call-out: Anastasiya Titova	
Bottom two: Nataliya Malyutina & Yuliya Ivanova	   	
Eliminated: Yuliya Ivanova

Episode 6
Original airdate: February 13, 2005

First call-out: Tatiana Tanayeva		
Bottom two: Anastasiya Titova &  Anna Borodina		
Eliminated: Anna Borodina

Episode 7
Original airdate: February 19, 2005

First call-out: Nataliya Malyutina	
Bottom two: Svetlana Kostecko & Svetlana Sergienko	   	
Eliminated: Svetlana Kostecko

Episode 8
Original airdate: February 20, 2005

First call-out: Kseniya Khizhnyak	
Bottom two: Arina Morozova & Tatiana Tanayeva	 
Eliminated: Tatiana Tanayeva

Episode 9
Original airdate: February 27, 2005

First call-out: Kseniya Khizhnyak		
Bottom two: Nataliya Malyutina & Svetlana Sergienko	   	
Eliminated: Nataliya Malyutina

Episode 10
Original airdate: February 28, 2005

First call-out: Svetlana Sergienko
Bottom two: Anastasiya Titova & Kseniya Khizhnyak	 	
Eliminated: Kseniya Khizhnyak

Episode 11
Original airdate: March 6, 2005

First call-out: Arina Morozova		
Bottom two: Anastasiya Titova & Svetlana Sergienko		    	
Eliminated: Anastasiya Titova

Episode 12
Original airdate: March 8, 2005

Final two: Arina Morozova & Svetlana Sergienko	 	
Ty - Supermodel: Svetlana Sergienko

Contestants
(ages stated are at start of contest)

Summaries

Call-out order

 The contestant was eliminated
 The contestant won the competition

Photo Shoot Guide
Episode 1 Photo Shoot: Garden of Eden
Episode 2 Photo Shoot: Shoes Advertising
Episode 3 Photo Shoot: Roped Up in tacky clothes
Episode 4 Photo Shoot: B&W Beauty Shoot  
Episode 5 Photo Shoot: Russian Sailors
Episode 6 Photo Shoot: Sports and Sex
Episode 7 Photo Shoot: Cosmopolitan cover
Episode 8 Photo Shoot: Underwater Nymphs 
Episode 9 Photo Shoot: Fashion Icons 
Episode 10 Photo Shoot: Avantgarde Style in Groups
Episode 11 Photo Shoot: Cocktail Party

Judges
Fyodor Bondarchuk (Host)
 Oxana Fedorova
Vlad Loktev
Ellen Verbeek

References

External links
Official website through internet archive

Top Model series (Russia)
2005 Russian television seasons